Autoroute 139 is a highway in France that links the A13 and Rouen.
It begins at exits 22 A13 and ends in the outskirts of Rouen on the N138.

The motorway was built in 1970 and was numbered A930 upon opening.

References

External links

A139 autoroute in Saratlas

A139